Peter Rybar (Vienna, 29 August 1913 — Lugano, 4 October 2002), was a Czech-Swiss violinist.
Most of Rybar's recordings were produced by Concert Hall, Westminster and Le Chant du Monde, especially Robert Schumann's Violin Concerto (with the Orchestre de Chambre de Lausanne directed by Victor Desarzens) and other works by Schumann for violin and piano (with Hélène Boschi).
Peter Rybar taught first at the Conservatory of Winterthur and then at the Conservatoire de Genève.

References 
Peter Rybar, "I'm playing the moon". Peter Rybar erzählt ... Geschichte aus seinem Leben, ed. Heidi Glitsch-Amsler, 2003.

External links
 The Guardian, obituary by Tully Potter (25 October 2002)

1913 births
2002 deaths
Czech violinists
Male violinists
Swiss violinists
20th-century violinists
20th-century Czech male musicians
Czechoslovak emigrants to Switzerland